Kieran Gibbons (born 6 February 1995) is a Scottish footballer who plays as a midfielder for Open Goal Broomhill.

Gibbons has also played for Aberdeen, Livingston, Cowdenbeath, Stenhousemuir.and East Kilbride. Gibbons is the cousin of Aston Villa captain John McGinn.

Career
Gibbons began his career at youth level with Hamilton Academical, leaving the club in 2009; upon his departure he was then unable to sign for another club unless they paid Hamilton £9000 in compensation. In January 2011, Hamilton agreed to release his registration and he signed for Aberdeen. He made his only appearance on 23 November 2014, coming on as an 86th-minute substitute for Cammy Smith in their 1–0 win at Partick Thistle in the Scottish Premiership. He was an unused substitute in five more league matches and one Scottish Cup fixture as Aberdeen finished as Premiership runners-up.

On 30 June 2015, after a trial, Gibbons signed for Scottish Championship club Livingston. He made his debut on 25 July, in the first round of the Scottish Challenge Cup, playing the entirety of a 2–1 home win over Clyde. In February 2016, Gibbons signed on loan with Cowdenbeath for the remainder of the 2015–16 season.

Gibbons joined East Kilbride in the 2016 close season, spending two seasons with the side before joining Stenhousemuir in May 2018.

On 16 September 2019, Stenhousemuir agreed to terminate Gibbon's contract in order for him to pursue first team football elsewhere. Gibbons rejoined East Kilbride the same day.

Gibbons moved to East Stirlingshire on 1 July 2020. 

Gibbons started every game for the Lowland League side, partnering ex-Aberdeen FC teammate Nicky Low in central midfield.

The midfielder signed for Open Goal Broomhill in 2022.

Honours

Aberdeen
SPFL Reserve League 2014/15 

East Kilbride
 Lowland Football League: 2016–17
SFA South Region Challenge Cup: 2016–17
East of Scotland Qualifying Cup: 2017–18

References

External links

1995 births
Living people
Association football midfielders
Scottish footballers
Hamilton Academical F.C. players
Aberdeen F.C. players
Livingston F.C. players
Cowdenbeath F.C. players
East Kilbride F.C. players
Stenhousemuir F.C. players
Scottish Professional Football League players
Lowland Football League players
Broomhill F.C. (Scotland) players